Osmia subfasciata is a species of bee in the family Megachilidae. It is found in Central America and North America.

Subspecies
These two subspecies belong to the species Osmia subfasciata:
 Osmia subfasciata miamiensis Mitchell
 Osmia subfasciata subfasciata

References

Further reading

External links

 

subfasciata
Articles created by Qbugbot
Insects described in 1872